The Centre for Human Rights is an organisation at the University of Pretoria Faculty of Law.

Centre for Human Rights may also refer to:

Asian Centre for Human Rights
Bahrain Centre for Human Rights
Cambodian Center for Human Rights
Latvian Centre for Human Rights
Palestinian Centre for Human Rights
Southern Center for Human Rights, in Atlanta, Georgia, United States

See also
Centre for Human Rights and Rehabilitation, Malawi
European Inter-University Centre for Human Rights and Democratisation
Ministry of Human Rights (disambiguation)